DPHS, in the United States, may stand for:

Deer Park High School (disambiguation):
 Deer Park Junior/Senior High School, Cincinnati, Ohio
 Deer Park High School (New York), Deer Park, New York, on Long Island
 Deer Park High School (Texas), in the Deer Park Independent School District, Deer Park, Texas
Dr. Phillips High School, Orlando, Florida
Dos Pueblos High School Goleta, California
De Pere High School, a senior high school in De Pere, Wisconsin